Dornier Aviation Nigeria is an airline based in Kaduna, Nigeria. It operates Dornier aircraft in Nigeria on a charter basis, as well as running a fixed-base and maintenance operation. It also undertakes agricultural flying, aerial photography and emergency medical evacuation services. Its main base is Old Kaduna Airport. Dornier Aviation Nigeria also participated in the 2015 Hajj airlift led by the National Hajj Commission of Nigeria, the airlift was financed by Nigerian Businessman Babangida Inuwa.

History
It was established in 1979 and has 207 employees (at March 2007).

The Nigerian government set a deadline of April 30, 2007 for all airlines operating in the country to re-capitalise or be grounded, in an effort to ensure better services and safety. The airline satisfied the Nigerian Civil Aviation Authority (NCAA)’s criteria in terms of re-capitalization and was re-registered for operation.

Destinations 
Dornier Aviation Nigeria operates no scheduled services.

Fleet

Current fleet
The Dornier Aviation Nigeria fleet consists of the following aircraft (as of August 2019):

Former fleet
The airline fleet previously included the following aircraft (at March 2007):
 14 Dornier 228-212

References

External links

Official website

Airlines of Nigeria
Airlines established in 1979
Kaduna